Delopleurus parvus, is a species of dung beetle found in India, Sri Lanka and Nepal.

Description
This small subquadrate, highly convex species has an average length of about 5 to 6 mm. Body black, and shiny. Antennae, and mouthparts are red in color with yellowish antennal club. Head densely and rugosely punctured. Elytra trapezoidal. Elytra finely striate with very strong widely spaced punctures. Bilobate pygidium with wide borders. 

The species has found in habitats such as under a puffball fungus.

References 

Scarabaeinae
Insects of Sri Lanka
Insects of India
Insects described in 1875